Therapy is the second studio album by English singer Anne-Marie. It was released on 23 July 2021, through Major Tom's and Asylum Records. It features guest appearances by KSI, Digital Farm Animals, Little Mix, Niall Horan, Nathan Dawe, MoStack, and Rudimental. The album was supported by four singles: "Don't Play", "Way Too Long", "Our Song", and "Kiss My (Uh-Oh)", while "Beautiful" was released as the only promotional single off the album on 12 July 2021.

The album received generally positive reviews from music critics and was also a commercial success. Therapy peaked at number 2 in both the UK albums chart and the Scottish albums chart. It also peaked at number 4 on the Irish albums chart.

Background 
Planning for Anne-Marie's second album began in 2019; in an interview with Music Week in March of that year, she provided information on her upcoming second studio album, stating "I love the studio. I was able to get in there and have some sort of therapy with my own brain for a week and that's going towards the next album". She further commented that "the first album was made up of so many songs that people had heard for years and that's amazing. But for me as a creative person, I'm writing something new all the time and all I want to do is put it out straight away. That wasn't the way it happened with [the debut] album so, for this next one, I'm hoping to be more active on writing and put something out straight away that's fresh and no one's heard before."

During 2020, Anne-Marie released the standalone singles "Birthday", "Her", "To Be Young" (featuring American singer and rapper Doja Cat) and  "Problems", with "Birthday" and "To Be Young" later appearing on the Japanese edition of Therapy. 

On 15 January 2021, Anne-Marie released the lead single of Therapy, "Don't Play", in collaboration with British YouTuber and rapper-singer KSI and English DJ and producer Digital Farm Animals. On 9 April 2021, the second single "Way Too Long" was released in collaboration with English producer Nathan Dawe and British rapper MoStack. On 21 May 2021, the third single "Our Song", a collaboration with Niall Horan, was released. On that date, Anne-Marie announced the title, cover art, and release date of Therapy. She later announced that she would embark on the Dysfunctional Tour in 2022, and Therapy: The Live Experience on 7 August 2021 in support of the album.

On 6 July 2021, via Twitter, Anne-Marie created a website that involved her fans/followers to figure out the track-listing for the album, with new ones appearing daily.

On 7 July 2021, random followers were sent DMs of one of two snippets of a song along with parts of the title. The track was revealed to be "Kiss My (Uh-Oh)" with British girlband Little Mix on 8 July 2021. The song samples "Never Leave You (Uh Oooh, Uh Oooh)" by Lumidee. The track was announced as the album's fourth single on 9 July 2021 along with its release date being 23 July 2021. A snippet of the song was released on TikTok. The cover was revealed on Anne-Marie's social media on 21 July 2021. On the day of release the song was accompanied by a music video was directed by Hannah Lux Davis. The music video parodies the 2011 comedy film Bridesmaids.

Composition
Therapy was described by music critics as a genre-hopping pop album that draws influence from trance, indie, electronic, trap, UK garage, and pop rock. The opener, "x2", begins as a soulful song before turning into a revenge track. Lead single "Don't Play" was described as a 2-step-influenced UK garage track about heartache. "Kiss My (Uh-Oh)", a collaboration with Little Mix, was described as a calypso-pop number that was compared to the works of Beyoncé. It samples "Never Leave You (Uh Oooh, Uh Oooh)" by Lumidee. "Who I Am" was described as a pop song with lyrics of defiance and self-acceptance. "Unlovable", a collaboration with Rudimental, is a "fist-pumping" dance track. "Beautiful" sees the singer detailing her own insecurities over what NME described as swaying percussion. The tracks "Tell Your Girlfriend" and "Better Not Together" both contain lyrics about turning heartbreak into self-confidence. The title track serves as the closer for the album, being a trop-pop number.

Promotion

Dysfunctional Tour 

On 28 May 2021, Anne-Marie announced the Dysfunctional Tour, scheduled to take place from 3 to 11 May 2022 and 26 November to 7 December 2022. The tour locations were also announced, with the singer performing in cities across Europe and North America. Tickets were released to the general public on 4 June at 10am BST, with the option of pre-sale tickets given to those who pre-ordered Therapy through the singers's official website. The pre-sale tickets were available from 2 to 4 September (for the London and Leeds shows only).

Setlist
This setlist comes from opening night in Dublin on 3 May 2022, it does not represent his setlist for the remainder of the tour.

"Ciao Adios"
"x2"
"Alarm"
"Tell Your Girlfriend"
"Then"
"Rockabye"
"Therapy"
"Our Song"
"Breathing"
"Beautiful"
"Perfect to Me"
"Better Off"
"2002"
"Kiss My (Uh-Oh)"
"Way Too Long"
"Don't Play"

Encore

 "Friends"
"Birthday"

Critical reception

At Metacritic, which assigns a normalized rating out of 100 to reviews from mainstream critics, Therapy has an average score of 65 based on six reviews, indicating "generally favorable reviews". 

Ali Shutler of NME compared it favourably to her debut album, writing that while her previous effort "spent too much time playing it safe", "its follow-up Therapy doesn't make the same mistake". Referring to the record as "infinitely more confident" sonically, Shutler gave the album four out of five stars. Robin Murray, writing for Clash, was similarly favourable, rating the album seven out of ten. Murray wrote that the album "pushes her story to its next chapter, and while it features some surging highs, it doesn't quite dispel notions that Anne-Marie has yet to nail down a singular sound she can call her own". Ben Devlin of musicOMH gave the album four out of five stars writing, "her newest record is packed to the brim with famous faces on vocals, songwriting and production, but her relatable, unpretentious, sometimes playful delivery holds disparate sounds and moods together with ease." 

Lauren Murphy, writing for The Irish Times was slightly more mixed, criticising songs such as "Beautiful" and "Better Not Together", but states "the majority [of the tracks] land with a thud rather than a glance here". Dani Blum of Pitchfork dubbed the album "crisply rendered [and] competently hooky", noting that it "promises a more personal self-portrait, but [the British singer] ends up disappearing into vague songwriting and anodyne dance-pop production." Michael Cragg of The Guardian was more negative, referring to the album as a "missed opportunity", criticising the amount of collaborators on the album for overshadowing the singer, while preferring the "moments when Anne-Marie's brand of plain-spoken yet vulnerable pop shines through". He ultimately rated the album two out of five stars.

Commercial performance
In its first charting week, Therapy opened at number-two on the UK Albums Chart with sales of 18,260, of which 12,463 were physical copies.

Track listing

Notes 
"Kiss My (Uh-Oh)" samples "Never Leave You (Uh Oooh, Uh Oooh)", written by Lumidee Cedeño, Teddy Mendez, Edwin Perez, Steven "Lenky" Marsden, Steven Marsden, Trevor Smith, and John Jackson, as performed by Lumidee.
  indicates a main and vocal producer
  indicates an additional producer
  indicates a co-producer
  indicates a vocal producer

Personnel 
Credits adapted from Tidal.

Musicians

 Anne-Marie – vocals (all tracks), backing vocals (1)
 Raye – backing vocals (1)
 James Murray – bass synthesizer, drums, percussion, sound effects (1); programming (8, 11)
 Mustafa Omer – bass synthesizer, drums, percussion, sound effects (1); programming (8, 11)
 Lostboy – drum programming, synthesizer programming (1)
 Fred Ball – keyboards, percussion (1, 7)
 Andrew Murray – keyboards, strings programming (1); harp, live strings (2, 15); programming (11)
 Digital Farm Animals – bass, drums, keyboards, percussion, piano, programming, sound effects, strings, synthesizer (2, 15)
 Mojam – drums, sound effects, synthesizer (2, 3, 15); keyboards, programming (2, 15); bass, guitar, percussion (3)
 KSI – vocals (2, 15)
 Pete Nappi – guitar, keyboards (3)
 Lewis Thompson – keyboards (3)
 Little Mix – vocals (3)
 Keith Ten4 Sorrells – drum programming, gang vocals, programming (4)
 Oak Felder – drum programming, gang vocals, keyboards, programming (4, 14)
 Alex Nice – gang vocals, keyboards, programming (4)
 Ben Kohn – bass (5, 12), piano (16)
 Tom Barnes – drums (5, 12)
 Pete Kelleher – keyboards (5, 12), bass (16)
 Niall Horan – guitar, vocals (5)
 Vern Asbury – guitar (5)
 Dyo – backing vocals (6)
 Grades – bass, drums, piano, programming, strings, synthesizer (6)
 Sire Noah – bass, drums, piano, programming, strings, synthesizer (6)
 Tre Jean-Marie – bass, drums, piano, synthesizer (6, 8); programming (6, 8, 11), strings (6), keyboards (8), vocoder (11)
 Nathan Dawe – programming (6), remixer (15)
 MoStack – vocals (6)
 Amy Langley – cello (7)
 Rudimental – vocals (8)
 Amir Amor – drums, keyboards, programming (8)
 Leon Rolle – drums, keyboards (8)
 Piers Aggett – drums, synthesizer (8)
 Kesi Dryden – drums, keyboards (8)
 Mark Crown – trumpet (8)
 Claire Hack – backing vocals (9)
 Jenny Addis – backing vocals (9)
 Nicola Lambrianos – backing vocals (9)
 Sebastian Hack – backing vocals (9)
 Siena Hack – backing vocals (9)
 Sue Nicholson – backing vocals (9)
 Wayne Nicholson – backing vocals (9)
 Elvira Anderfjärd – bass, drums, keyboards, programming (9)
 Blake Slatkin – bass, drums, keyboards, programming (10)
 Aod – guitar (12)
 Cameron Gower Poole – additional programming (12)
 Chris Bishop – additional programming (12)
 Teo Halm – bass, drums, piano, programming, synthesizer (14)
 Louis Bell – drums, keyboards, piano, programming, strings (14)
 JJ Lin – lead vocals (16)

Technical

 Stuart Hawkes – masterer (1, 3–5, 7–14)
 Kevin Grainger – masterer, mixer (2, 6); engineer (2)
 Geoff Swan – mixer (1, 7, 8, 10–12)
 Phil Tan – mixer (3)
 Charlie Holmes – mixer (4)
 Mark "Spike" Stent – mixer (5, 13)
 Serban Ghenea – mixer (9)
 Manny Marroquin – mixer (14)
 Chris Galland – mix engineer (14)
 James F. Reynolds – mixing engineer (16)
 Fred Ball – engineer (1, 7)
 Lostboy – engineer (1)
 Paul Norris – engineer (3)
 Pete Nappi – engineer (3)
 TMS – engineer, vocal recording engineer (5, 12), vocal engineer (16)
 James Murray – engineer (8, 11)
 Mustafa Omer – engineer (8, 11)
 John Hanes – engineer (9)
 Keith Ten4 Sorrells – engineer (1)
 Cameron Gower Poole – vocal engineer (2, 15, 16), additional vocal recording engineer (5)
 S-X – vocal engineer (2, 15)
 Rob Macfarlane – vocal recording engineer (2, 15)
 Tom Hough – vocal engineer, additional vocal recording engineer (6)
 JJ Lin – vocal engineer (16)
 Joe Burgess – assistant mixer (1, 7, 8, 10, 11)
 Niko Battistini – assistant mixer (1, 7, 8, 10, 11)
 Bill Zimmerman – assistant mixer (3)
 Matt Wolach – assistant mixer (5, 13)
 Dave Emery – assistant mixer (13)
 Jeremie Inhaber – assistant mix engineer (14)
 Robin Florent – assistant mix engineer (14)
 Scott Desmarais – assistant mix engineer (14)
 Ari Starace – additional vocal recording engineer (14)

Charts

Weekly charts

Year-end charts

Certifications

Release history

References 

 
2021 albums
Asylum Records albums
Anne-Marie (singer) albums
Albums produced by TMS (production team)
Albums produced by Fred Ball (producer)
Albums produced by Digital Farm Animals
Major Tom's albums
Albums produced by Tre Jean-Marie